The Crystal Cascades is a cascade waterfall on the Freshwater Creek in the Far North region of Queensland, Australia.

Location and features
The Crystal Cascades is located in a relatively unspoilt section of the upper Freshwater Creek, in the Redlynch Valley, west of Cairns, with numerous waterfalls and swimming waterholes popular with locals and tourists. The largest waterhole is sited alongside a sheer cliff which locals and tourists climb to jump into the adjoining deep waterhole. The most famous part of the cliff is called "No Fear" which is the highest perch from which to jump. In 2014 an 18yearold man drowned when he failed to resurface after slipping over the edge of the waterfall, while swimming in a restricted area.

See also

 List of waterfalls of Queensland

References

External links 

Cairns Attractions Website

  

Waterfalls of Far North Queensland
Cascade waterfalls